Honeysuckle is a 1938 Argentine musical film directed by Luis César Amadori. With Ivo Pelay, Amadori co-wrote the play upon which the film is based. Starring Hugo del Carril, Libertad Lamarque and Malisa Zini, it premièred in Buenos Aires on 5 November 1938 and was a popular success. Its plot is loosely based on the lyrics of a tango song of the same name. It is a tango film, an extremely popular genre during the Golden Age of Argentine Cinema. It was screened at the Venice Film Festival.

During the production Del Caril met Ana María Lynch who was working on the film as an extra. They began a decade-long relationship during which time the couple appeared together in several films.

Synopsis
A film star enjoys a romance with the daughter of a puppeteer, but his criminal past threatens to ruin it.

Cast
 Libertad Lamarque
 Hugo del Carril
 Malisa Zini
 Miguel Gómez Bao
 Perla Mary
 Leo Rapoli
 Julio Traversa
 Julio Renato
 Max Citelli
 Alberto Terrones
 Amelia Lamarque
 Arturo Bamio
 Ángel Boffa

References

Bibliography 
 Rist, Peter H. Historical Dictionary of South American Cinema. Rowman & Littlefield, 2014.

External links

1938 films
1938 musical films
Argentine musical films
1930s Spanish-language films
Argentine black-and-white films
Films directed by Luis César Amadori
1930s Argentine films